Sundown to Midnight is the second full-length album from California ska band The Dingees

Track listing
 "Rally-O" – 2:47
 "Can't Trust No Man" – 2:46
 "Votes And Violence" – 2:41
 "Radio Freedom" – 3:45
 "Leave The Kids Alone" – 1:39
 "Trial Tribulation" – 4:17
 "Chevy Maibu" – 2:54
 "Staff Sgt. Skreba" – 1:35
 "Dark Hollywood" – 5:40
 "San Francisco" – 3:14
 "New Route" – 3:36
 "Sundown To Midnight" – 2:04
 "You In My Heart" – 2:26

Musicians
Pegleg – Vocals
Aaron Landers – Guitar
Bean Hernandez – Fender Bass
Dave Chevalier – Vocals, Sax
Frank Lenz – Drums
Steve Kravac – Drums and Percussion
Travis Larson – Trombone
Justin Berardino – Alto Sax
Ronnie King – Keys

References

The Dingees albums
1999 albums
Tooth & Nail Records albums